Boris Khristov (born 6 February 1897, date of death unknown) was a Bulgarian sports shooter. He competed in the 50 m rifle event at the 1936 Summer Olympics.

References

1897 births
Year of death missing
Bulgarian male sport shooters
Olympic shooters of Bulgaria
Shooters at the 1936 Summer Olympics
Place of birth missing